The Personals can refer to:

 Personal advertisement, personal classified advertisement used to find romance or friendship
 The Personals (1982 film), an American film directed by Peter Markle 
 The Personals (1998 American film), a short documentary film directed by Keiko Ibi 
 The Personals (1998 Taiwanese film), a film directed by Chen Kuo-fu

See also
 Personal (disambiguation)